Waldemar Ksienzyk (born 10 November 1963 in Zabrze, Silesia, Poland) is a German former professional footballer who played as a defender.

He played 206 East German and 25 Bundesliga matches.

Ksienzyk won his only cap for the East Germany national team in 1987 against Tunisia.

References

External links
 
 
 

1963 births
Living people
Sportspeople from Zabrze
Association football midfielders
German footballers
East German footballers
East Germany international footballers
1. FC Union Berlin players
Berliner FC Dynamo players
Wuppertaler SV players
FC Schalke 04 players
SV Waldhof Mannheim players
SV Babelsberg 03 players
Bundesliga players
2. Bundesliga players
DDR-Oberliga players
Polish emigrants to East Germany